also known as Pro Yakyū: Family Stadium and Famista, is a series of baseball sports video games initially developed and released by Namco in Japan, and later developed and published by Bandai Namco Entertainment. The first entry in the series, Pro Baseball: Family Stadium, was released for the Nintendo Family Computer in 1986 and later in North America as R.B.I. Baseball (subsequent games in this series would see various names used when exported to North America but none after 1992), with the series being released on numerous home consoles, the latest being Pro Yakyuu Famista 2020 in 2020 for the Nintendo Switch. The series is considered a precursor to Namco's own World Stadium series of baseball games, released for arcades, PlayStation and GameCube. The series has been a commercial success since, with over 15 million copies being sold as of 2016.

In April 1993, Famicom Tsūshin (Famitsu) magazine awarded Family Stadium a world record for being the video game franchise with the most published video game releases, with fourteen video games published for the series up until then.

List of games

See also
World Stadium
Great Sluggers

Notes

References

External links
 

Baseball video games
Bandai Namco Entertainment franchises
 
Bandai Namco games
Japan-exclusive video games
Video games developed in Japan
Video game franchises introduced in 1986